Trinidad and Tobago competed at the 2020 Winter Youth Olympics in Lausanne, Switzerland from 9 to 22 January 2020. The country entered the competition with one female alpine skier. 

This marked Trinidad and Tobago's Winter Youth Olympics debut.

Alpine skiing

Trinidad and Tobago qualified one female skier. Viera was born in the United States, but chose to compete for her parents' birth country.

Viera's older sister served as the coach, while her dad served as the team's chef de mission.

Girl

See also
Trinidad and Tobago at the 2020 Summer Olympics

References

2020 in Trinidad and Tobago sport
Nations at the 2020 Winter Youth Olympics
Trinidad and Tobago at the Youth Olympics